Raja Sir Nahar Singh   (7 November 1855 – 24 June 1932) was the ruler of princely state of Shahpura from 1870 to 1932.

He attended the Coronation of the King-Emperor Edward VII and Queen-Empress Alexandra at Westminster Abbey in 1902. He was granted a permanent salute of 9-guns in 1925.

He mortgaged the family jewels and private property to construct the irrigation tanks named Nahar Sagar and Umed Sagar to assist his drought-ridden subjects. He established a system of local government, with a large measure of representation, modeled on the London County Council. An energetic and modern ruler, he built schools, hospitals and roads, which transformed his little state out of all recognition.

He was Chairman of Paropkarini Sabha 1893-1932, Member of Mahand Raj Sabha, All India Kshatriya Mahasabha - 1922.

He received Prince of Wales's Medal (1876), Kaiser-i-Hind Medal (1877), Coronation Medal (1902), and the Delhi Durbar Medals of 1903 and 1911. He was created a Knight Commander of the Order of the Indian Empire(KCIE) in the 1903 Durbar Honours.

He was one of the longest ruling monarchs.

References

1855 births
1932 deaths
Knights Commander of the Order of the Indian Empire
Indian royalty
Recipients of the Kaisar-i-Hind Medal
People from Rajasthan